The Battle of Thermae was a field engagement during the First Punic War that took place in 259 BC near Thermae on the northern coast of Sicily. The Carthaginian general Hamilcar surprised and defeated 6,000 allied troops of Rome.

Separated from the main Roman force of 20,000 men due to disagreements, the allies were attacked and crushed near Thermae, losing 4,000–6,000 killed. Hamilcar went on to capture Enna and Camarina in the aftermath.

Prelude
Hamilcar, the commander of the Carthaginian land forces in Sicily, had stationed his army near Panormus. He received word that the Romans and their allies, with a total force of 20,000 men, quarreled over their accomplishments in battle, and that the 6,000 allies were isolated in their encampment between Paropus and Thermae.

Battle
Hamilcar attacked the Roman allies with his entire army of 50,000, taking by surprise the allies, who were preparing to move out. Some 4,000–6,000 allies were killed.

Aftermath
Hamilcar exploited his victory to capture Enna and Camarina that same year with the aid of traitors in the two cities.

Citations

Bibliography

 

Thermae
Thermae
Thermae
Thermae
Battles involving the Roman Republic